The qualification group stage matches were played from 15 August to 6 September 2006. Winners of the group stage were advanced to the play-offs.

Group 1

Group 2

Group 3

Group 4

Group 5

Group 6

Group 7

Group 8

Group 9

Group 10

Group 11

Group 12

Group 13

Group 14

External links
 Group stage results at UEFA.com

Qualification group stage
Qual group stage